Haskayne is a small village in the county of Lancashire, England, and on the West Lancashire Coastal Plain. It is to the north of Downholland Cross on the A5147 and the Leeds and Liverpool Canal.

The village is in Downholland civil parish, and forms part of the Aughton & Downholland ward, which is represented by three Conservative Party councillors and is part of the district of West Lancashire.

Etymology
The name Haskayne is of Brittonic origin. The first element is hesg, meaning "sedge" (Welsh hesg, Breton hesk, Irish seisc; see Heskin). The second is one of two suffixes, the singularitve -en, or -en meaning "distinguished by...".

See also

Listed buildings in Downholland

References

External links

Villages in Lancashire
Geography of the Borough of West Lancashire